Pasatiempo Golf Club is an 18-hole golf club on the West Coast of the United States, located in Pasatiempo, Santa Cruz County, California.

History

Marion Hollins hired English golf course designer Alister MacKenzie to design and build Pasatiempo gold course that included a equestrian center with polo fields. The course opened on September 8, 1929 with a celebrity golf match, with Bobby Jones in the first to play it. The course is famed for its breathtaking scenery and rich golf history.

MacKenzie claimed that it was his best layout, ahead of even Cypress Point and Augusta National, and his American home borders the sixth fairway. Pasatiempo is about an hour's drive from Cypress Point, a Monterey Peninsula neighbor to Spyglass Hill and Pebble Beach.

Pasatiempo is a highly rated course — it is ranked 12 in Golf Magazine's "Top 100 Courses You Can Play 2006-2007" and ranked 31 in Golf Digest's "2005 America’s Greatest Public Courses". Golf Digest also named Pasatiempo Golf Club as one of the top 3 "Courses You Can Play in California" (along with Pebble Beach and Spyglass Hill). The magazine ranked Pasatiempo 71 in the "Top 100 Courses in the U.S. (private and public)", up 13 places over the 2003 ranking.

The course was recreated in the videogames PGA Championship Golf and Tiger Woods PGA Tour 06.

Scorecard

References

External links

Pasatiempo Golf Club - Golf Course information with photos and interactive map.
Pasatiempo Maintenance
Northern California Golf Association – Pasatiempo Golf Club

San Jose State Spartans men's golf
Sports in Santa Cruz County, California
Golf clubs and courses in California
Buildings and structures in Santa Cruz County, California